2839 Annette is a bright Flora asteroid from the inner regions of the asteroid belt. It was discovered on 5 October 1929, by American astronomer Clyde Tombaugh at Lowell Observatory during his search for Pluto. It was named after the discoverer's daughter.

Orbit and classification 

Annette is a S-type asteroid and member of the Flora family, one of the largest families of stony asteroids. It orbits the Sun in the inner main-belt at a distance of 1.9–2.5 AU once every 3 years and 4 months (1,205 days). Its orbit has an eccentricity of 0.15 and an inclination of 5° with respect to the ecliptic. Due to a precovery taken at Lowell Observatory, the body's observation arc was extended by 4 days prior to its official discovery observation.

Naming 

This minor planet was named after Clyde Tombaugh's daughter, Annette. The approved naming citation was published by the Minor Planet Center on 22 June 1986.

Physical characteristics

Rotation period 

The first rotational lightcurve of Annette was obtained by American astronomer Brian Warner at his Palmer Divide Observatory, Colorado, in December 2005. It gave a rotation period of 10.457 hours with a brightness variation of 0.92 magnitude. In November 2006, a second lightcurve by astronomer Robert Buchheim at Altimira Observatory in southern California gave a concurring period of 10.4595 hours and an amplitude of 0.64 magnitude. He also noted a significantly fainter absolute magnitude of 14.35 than previously reported.

Diameter and albedo 

According to the survey carried out by NASA's Wide-field Infrared Survey Explorer with its subsequent NEOWISE mission, Annette measures between 5.41 and 7.562 kilometers in diameter and its surface has an albedo between 0.056 and 0.47, while the Collaborative Asteroid Lightcurve Link assumes an albedo of 0.24 – derived from 8 Flora, the largest member and namesake of its family – and calculates a diameter of 3.66 kilometers using Robert Buchheim's fainter absolute magnitude of 14.35.

References

External links 
 Lightcurve plot of 2839 Annette, Palmer Divide Observatory, B. D. Warner (2005)
 Lightcurve Database Query (LCDB), at www.minorplanet.info
 Dictionary of Minor Planet Names, Google books
 Asteroids and comets rotation curves, CdR – Geneva Observatory, Raoul Behrend
 Discovery Circumstances: Numbered Minor Planets (1)–(5000) – Minor Planet Center
 
 

002839
Discoveries by Clyde Tombaugh
002839
Named minor planets
19291005